Ian Thomson may refer to:

Ian Thomson (Fiji) (1920–2008), British colonial administrator in Fiji and Administrator of the British Virgin Islands
Ian Thomson (cricketer) (1929–2021), English cricketer who played five Test matches
Ian Thomson (Australian rules footballer) (born 1949), former VFL and WAFL player
Ian Thomson (rugby league) (born 1956), Australian rugby league footballer and administrator
Ian Thomson (rugby union) (1930–2014), Scottish rugby union player
Ian Thomson (writer) (born 1961), English author
Ian Thomson (umpire) (born 1963), Australian-born cricket umpire who represents Hong Kong
Ian Thomson, the New South Wales Government Architect from 1978 to 1988

See also
Iain Thomson (born 1968), American philosopher
Ian White-Thomson (1904–1997), Anglican clergyman
Ian Comrie-Thomson, rugby union player who represented Australia
Ian Thompson (disambiguation)